Giovanni Paterniti was an American Vice Consul who died in Palermo, Italy in 1911. He is interred within the Capuchin Catacombs. He was prepared by the noted embalmer Alfredo Salafia.

References

1911 deaths
Year of birth missing
Mummies